The Spanish Cross was an award of Nazi Germany given to German troops who participated in the Spanish Civil War, fighting for nationalist general, later Spanish caudillo, Francisco Franco.

History 

With the outbreak of the Spanish Civil War in July 1936, Germany sent the Condor Legion, drawn from the German air force and army, to aid Franco's Nationalist forces. On 14 April 1939, Germany instituted the Spanish Cross as a decoration for the German airmen and soldiers who fought in the Condor Legion during the war. A number of German Navy ships served in Spanish waters, their crew also qualifying for the cross.

The Spanish Cross was to be worn on the right breast below the pocket flap or, if awarded, below the Blood Order. After the death of the recipient, the award remains with the next-of-kin.

The wear of Nazi era awards was banned in 1945. The Spanish Cross was not among those awards reauthorised for official wear by the Federal Republic of Germany in 1957.

Classes 
The Spanish Cross filled the dual role of gallantry decoration and campaign medal. The Cross was awarded in Gold, Silver and Bronze classes to reflect the rank or merit of the recipient. The Silver and Bronze classes were awarded with and without swords, the Gold only with swords. For outstanding bravery in combat, the Gold class could be awarded with diamonds.

Each class, and the numbers awarded, were:

Bronze 
The non-combatant version was awarded without swords to military personnel or civilian technicians for three months of service in Spain without combat experience.

7,869 bronze crosses were awarded.

Bronze with Swords 
The Spanish Cross in Bronze with Swords was given to individuals involved in front line combat during the war.

8,462 bronze crosses with swords were awarded.

Silver 
The Silver Cross without swords was a non-combatant version awarded for merit.

327 silver crosses were awarded.

Silver with Swords 
The Spanish Cross in Silver was awarded to servicemen who took part in decisive battles or had considerable fighting experience.

8,304 silver crosses with swords were awarded.

Gold 
The Spanish Cross in Gold was awarded, only with swords, to servicemen who showed great merit in combat or exceptional leadership.

1,126 gold crosses were awarded.

Gold with Diamonds 

The Spanish Cross in Gold with Swords and Diamonds was the highest grade of the decoration. It was awarded to those who showed great leadership skills in battle or great merit. 

28 gold crosses with diamonds were awarded, one of which was presented to Adolf Galland.

Next of Kin 
A Cross of Honour for relatives of the German dead in Spain was awarded to relatives of servicemen who died during their service in Spain.

315 next of kin crosses were awarded.

Design  
The Spanish Cross is a Maltese cross with, in its centre, a swastika on a roundel. Between each arm of the cross is the Luftwaffe eagle and, for the versions with swords, two crossed swords, placed behind the eagle symbols. The diamond class had brilliants placed around the swastika in the central roundel. 

The reverse side is plain and has a pin used for wearing the cross on the uniform. 

The cross for next of kin is bronze and similar to the cross without swords, but smaller in size. Unlike the others, it is attached to a ribbon in black with edges in red, yellow, and red (the colours of the Spanish flag).

Recipients 

 Walter Adolph
 Wilhelm Balthasar*
 Hans-Henning Freiherr von Beust
 Gerhard Bigalk
 Hermann Boehm (admiral)
 Kurt Böhmer
 Hubertus von Bonin
 Eberhard Bopst
 Leopold Bürkner
 Rolf Carls
 Otto Ciliax
 Hans Degen
 Ulrich Diesing
 Oskar Dirlewanger
 Paul Drekmann
 Walter Ehle
 Hans Ehlers
 Diethelm von Eichel-Streiber
 Engelbert Endrass
 Wolfgang Ewald
 Klaus Ewerth
 Fritz Frauenheim
 Hans-Georg von Friedeburg
 Hans von Funck
 Adolf Galland*
 Walter Grabmann
 Karl-Heinz Greisert
 Robert Gysae
 Gotthard Handrick
 Martin Harlinghausen*
 Werner Hartenstein
 Hans Heidtmann
 Werner Henke
 Hajo Herrmann
 Johannes Hintz
 Erich Hippke
 Hermann Hogeback
 Herbert Ihlefeld
 Rolf Johannesson
 Bernhard Jope
 Rolf Kaldrack
 Bernd Klug
 Karl-Heinz Krahl
 Fritz-Julius Lemp
 Wolfgang Lippert (pilot)
 Fritz Losigkeit
 Walther Lucht
 Wolfgang Lüth
 Günther Lützow*
 August Maus
 Hans-Karl Mayer
 Wilhelm Meentzen
 Wilhelm Meisel
 Karl-Friedrich Merten
 Walter Model
 Johann Mohr
 Werner Mölders*
 Heinz Neukirchen
 Eduard Neumann (fighter pilot)
 Walter Oesau*
 Jürgen Oesten
 Adolf Piening
 Rolf Pingel
 Hermann Plocher
 Günther Radusch
 Hermann Rasch
 Hansjürgen Reinicke
 Rudolf Resch
 Wolfram Freiherr von Richthofen*
 Gustav Rödel
 Helmut Rosenbaum
 Jürgen von Rosenstiel
 Wolfgang Schellmann*
 Joachim Schlichting*
 Johann Schmid
 Rudolf Schmidt (Major)
 Herbert Schob
 Georg-Wilhelm Schulz
 Hans Seidemann
 Reinhard Seiler*
 Karl Smidt
 Hugo Sperrle*
 Albert Stecken
 Alois Stoeckl
 Wilhelm Ritter von Thoma*
 Horst Tietzen
 Werner Töniges
 Hannes Trautloft
 Heinrich Trettner
 Joachim Wandel
 Kurt Weyher
 Wolf-Dietrich Wilcke
 Joachim Ziegler
 Felix Zymalkowski

* Won the Spanish Cross in Gold with Swords and Diamonds version

References

Citations

Bibliography

Awards established in 1939
1939 establishments in Germany
Military awards and decorations of Nazi Germany
Spain in World War II
 
German campaign medals
Germany–Spain military relations
Military awards and decorations of the Spanish Civil War